He, She and the Money (Swedish: Han, hon och pengarna) is a 1936 Swedish comedy film directed by Anders Henrikson and starring Håkan Westergren, Kirsten Heiberg and Erik 'Bullen' Berglund. It marked the Swedish film debut of the Norwegian actress Heiberg.

The film's sets were designed by the art director Arne Åkermark.

Main cast
 Håkan Westergren as Göran Hilding  
 Kirsten Heiberg as Margarita Perkins  
 Erik 'Bullen' Berglund as Editor P. Andersson  
 Maritta Marke as Maria Barke  
 Eric Abrahamsson as Brovall  
 Ruth Stevens as Karin Grandin  
 John Precht as Herman Stål  
 Nils Ericsson as Nisse Karlsson  
 Carl Browallius as District Judge Widmark  
 Thor Modéen as Wholesaler Lindberg 
 Julia Cæsar as Miss Pallander
 Gösta Gustafson as 	Alstermo
 George Fant as Party guest 
 Sven-Eric Gamble as Bell boy

References

Bibliography 
 Per Olov Qvist & Peter von Bagh. Guide to the Cinema of Sweden and Finland. Greenwood Publishing Group, 2000.

External links 
 

1936 films
1936 comedy films
Swedish comedy films
1930s Swedish-language films
Films directed by Anders Henrikson
Swedish black-and-white films
1930s Swedish films